Harjipur is a village of Khol Block of Rewari, Rewari district, Haryana, India. It is in Gurgaon Division. Its postal head office is Khori. It is located near Khori Railway station.

Adjacent villages
Bawana Gujar , Mailawas , Pithrawas , Khori , Pali  are villages near Harjipur. It has an old shiv mandir.

References

Villages in Rewari district